Rowing at the 2007 Southeast Asian Games was held in the Map Prachan Reservoir, Chon Buri, Thailand.

Medalists

Men

Women

External links
Southeast Asian Games Official Results

2007 Southeast Asian Games events
Southeast Asian Games
2007